Chunqiu or Ch'un-ch'iu, literally Spring(s) and Autumn(s), may refer to:

 Spring and Autumn Annals, the annals of the State of Lu covering the years 722–481 BC
 Spring and Autumn period (roughly 771–476 BC), named after the annals
 Several other ancient Chinese annals
 Lüshi Chunqiu
 Yanzi chunqiu
 Spring and Autumn Annals of Wu and Yue
 Spring and Autumn Annals of the Sixteen Kingdoms
 Spring and Autumn Annals of the Ten Kingdoms
Tjhoen Tjhioe, a 1910s Malay-language Peranakan Chinese newspaper from Surabaya, Dutch East Indies

See also
Spring Airlines, also known as Chunqiu Airlines, a Chinese airline carrier